Babushkinsky District is an administrative and municipal district (raion), one of the twenty-six in Vologda Oblast, Russia. It is located in the southeast of the oblast and borders with Nyuksensky District in the north, Kichmengsko-Gorodetsky District in the northeast, Nikolsky District in the east, Kologrivsky and Chukhlomsky Districts of Kostroma Oblast in the south, and with Totemsky District in the west. Its administrative center is the rural locality (a selo) of imeni Babushkina. District's population:  14,994 (2002 Census);  The population of imeni Babushkina accounts for 31.6% of the district's population.

Name
Prior to 1941, the district was known as Ledengsky District, and the selo of imeni Babushkina was known as Ledengskoye. Both the district and its administrative center were renamed in March 1941 to commemorate Bolshevik revolutionary Ivan Babushkin, who was born in Ledengskoye.

Geography
The district is located at the divide between the basins of the Sukhona, the Yug, and the Unzha Rivers (the left tributary of the Volga), and thus at the divide between the basins of the Arctic Ocean and the Caspian Sea. The landscape is dominated by the Northern Ridge chain of hills. The Unzha crosses the southern part of the district from east to west, and many rivers in the center and the south of the district drain into the Unzha. The rivers in the northeast of the district drain into the Sharzhenga, the left tributary of the Yug. The rivers in the west drain into various right tributaries of the Sukhona, such as the Tolshma, the Ledenga, and the Staraya Totma.

Over 80% of the total area of the district is covered by coniferous forests.

History
The area was populated by Finnic peoples and then colonized by the Novgorod Republic. In the 12th century, Totma and the surrounding areas were already under the control of Novgorod. After the fall of Novgorod, the area became a part of the Grand Duchy of Moscow. In the 14th century, salt was discovered in the valley of the Ledenga, and the selo of Ledengskoye (now called imeni Babushkina) became known for its salt production.

In the course of the administrative reform carried out in 1708 by Peter the Great, the area was included into Archangelgorod Governorate. In 1780, the governorate was abolished, and transformed into Totemsky Uyezd of Vologda Viceroyalty. The latter was abolished in 1796, and the part of it which included Ledengskoye was made into Vologda Governorate.

On July 15, 1929, several governorates, including Vologda Governorate, were merged into Northern Krai, and the uyezds were abolished. Instead, Ledengsky District with the administrative center in the selo of Ledengskoye was established as a part of Vologda Okrug. It included parts of the former area of Totemsky Uyezd. In the following years, the first-level administrative division of Russia kept changing. In 1936, Northern Krai was transformed into Northern Oblast. In 1937, Northern Oblast was split into Arkhangelsk Oblast and Vologda Oblast. Ledengsky District remained in Vologda Oblast ever since, but was renamed Babushkinsky in 1941. During the abortive Khrushchyov administrative reform of the 1960s, Babushkinsky District was briefly disestablished in 1962 and then reestablished in 1965.

In 1918, Northern Dvina Governorate with the administrative center in Veliky Ustyug was established on the areas previously in the northeast of Vologda Governorate. In 1924, the uyezds in Northern Dvina Governorate were abolished and replaced with the districts. On June 10, 1924, Roslyatinsky District was established, among others. The administrative center of Roslyatinsky District was the selo of Roslyatino. In 1929, Northern Dvina Governorate was merged into Northern Krai. On July 30, 1931, Roslyatinsky District was merged into Ledengsky District, then in 1935 it was re-established, and on November 12, 1960 Roslyatinsky District was abolished again, and its area was divided between Babushkinsky and Nikolsky Districts.

Administrative and municipal divisions
Administratively, the district is divided into fifteen selsoviets. Municipally, the district is incorporated as Babushkinsky Municipal District and is divided into seven rural settlements. The municipal district includes all of the inhabited localities of the administrative district, as well as two rural localities (the settlements of Ida and Kordon) from Gryazovetsky District and one rural locality (the settlement of Ilezka) from Nyuksensky District.

Economy
The economy of the district is based on timber production.

Agriculture
As of 2009, there were twelve large-scale farms in the district, mostly producing meat and milk, as well as growing crops. The agriculture is steadily shrinking.

Transportation
A paved road connecting Totma with Nikolsk passes through the district and, in particular, through imeni Babushkina. Before the road between Totma and Veliky Ustyug along the Sukhona was completed in the first decade of the 2000s, this was the only road connecting Vologda and Totma to Veliky Ustyug.

The only railroad in the district is the Monza Railroad, built for timber transport and operated by the timber production authorities, which runs along the border of Vologda and Kostroma Oblasts. The railroad crosses Babushkinsky District from west to east. Plans to extend it further east to Nikolsk were never implemented.

Culture and recreation

The district contains 1 object classified as cultural heritage of the federal significance (a monument to Ivan Babushkin in the selo of imeni Babushkina) and 106 objects classified as cultural and historical heritage of local significance. Most of these are wooden farms and churches built before 1917.

The only state museum in the district is the Memorial Museum of Ivan Babushkin, located in imeni Babushkina.

The Ledengsk Spa Resort in imeni Babushkina uses underground lakes with high concentration of salt.

References

Notes

Sources

Districts of Vologda Oblast
States and territories established in 1929
States and territories disestablished in 1962
States and territories established in 1965